Sharmin Akter Nipa (born 27 October 1992), known as Mahiya Mahi, is a Bangladeshi film actress. She is considered as the current highest paid actress of Bangladeshi film industry. She made her debut in the film Bhalobashar Rong in 2012 which was a huge financial success.

Career

2012
Mahi made her acting debut with Bhalobashar Rong in 2012, opposite to another debutante Bappy Chowdhury. Bhalobashar Rong is referred as the first Bangladeshi digital cinema according to Jaaz Multimedia. The film was declared as a huge financial success.

2013
In 2013, Mahi appeared in four films. Her first release was Onnorokom Bhalobasha. Again opposite to Bappy Chowdhury. Her next release was PoraMon, opposite to Symon Sadik.

Her third film of the year marked her first collaboration with Bangladeshi Cinema's leading actor Shakib Khan as they were paired up in Bhalobasha Aaj Kal for the first time. The couple was well received by the audience and the film was declared as a major box-office success. The Daily Star noted about the film, "The Shakib Khan and Mahiya Mahi duo was adorable". New Age reported, "'Shakib-Mahi duo is very well-matched. Paired up with heartthrob Shakib Khan, Mahi won the hearts of the film lovers through her acting in Bhalobasha Aaj Kal".

Mahi's last release was Tobuo Bhalobashi, once again opposite to Bappy Chowdhury.

2014
Mahi's first release in 2014 is Ki Darun Dekhte.

Her next and long-awaited movie Agnee, opposite to Arifin Shuvoo, is a women-centric crime thriller film. It became one of the most commercially successful films in Dhallywood history. Agnee brought Mahi 'Best Film Actress ' for the 1st time from Meril Prothom Alo Awards in 2014

Dobir Saheber Songsar is the first comedy movie performed by Mahi. She played three roles at a time in this movie. It did average in the box office.

Her Next film is "Honeymoon" with Bappy Chowdhury and director by Shafi Uddin Shafi. Honeymoon relies time of eid ul fitr & production house of Jaaz Multimedia.

Onek Sadher Moyna released on 7 November. It is the remake of film 'Moyna-Moti' of 1969 played by the legends Abdur Razzak and Kabori. The film did excellent in the box office.

In the film Desha: The Leader, Mahi plays the role of a journalist, opposite Shipan Mitra. For the first time she will be found as a lyricist in this movie.

2015
In 2015 she starred as Juliet in Romeo vs Juliet opposite Joey Debroy and Ankush Hazra, directed by Ashok Pati. She played the title role in Shafi Uddin Shafi's Big Brother, opposite Shipan Mitra and played the role of a journalist in Warning, opposite Arifin Shuvoo. Mahi also starred in Agnee 2, the sequel to Agnee.

In media

Mahi is reported as "a new sensation" by all Bangladeshi media. The Daily Ittefaq and Asian TV program Movie Bazaar has declared Mahi as the best actress of 2013.

Mahi became the brand ambassador of Unilever's beauty brand Fair & Lovely in April 2014.

Personal life
Mahi was first married to Mahmud Pervez Opu, a businessman from Sylhet, during 2016–2021. On 13 September 2021, she married Rakib Sarker, a businessman and politician from Gazipur.

Education 
Mahi completed her schooling from Uttara High School and HSC from Dhaka City College with very good results. In Feb 2014 she was studying second-year student in Fashion Designing. She switched universities in 2015.

Filmography

===Short films===

Web series

Music video

Awards and nominations

References

External links 
 

Living people
People from Rajshahi District
Bangladeshi film actresses
21st-century Bangladeshi actresses
Best Film Actress Meril-Prothom Alo Award winners
Best Actress Bachsas Award winners
1992 births
Place of birth missing (living people)